KVLV (980 AM) is a radio station broadcasting a country music format. Licensed to Fallon, Nevada, United States, the station is currently owned by Lahontan Valley Broadcasting Company, LLC and features programming from ABC Radio  and Jones Radio Network.  Artists played include Eddy Arnold, Roger Miller, and Jimmy Dean.

References

External links

VLV
VLV